Philosinidae is a family of damselflies in the order Odonata. There are at least 2 genera and about 12 described species in Philosinidae, found mainly in southeast Asia.

Genera
These two genera belong to the family Philosinidae:
 Philosina Ris, 1917
 Rhinagrion Calvert, 1913

References

Calopterygoidea
Odonata families